WhiteWater West is a manufacturing company based in Richmond, British Columbia, Canada. It was established in 1980 and manufactures a variety of products for water parks including water slides and water play areas. The company also owns FlowRider, which produces a line of surf simulators.

History

In 1980, WhiteWater West was established by Geoff Chutter, a former accountant. The company's first project was the WhiteWater Waterslide and Recreation Complex in Penticton, Canada.

In 1982, WhiteWater West acquired WhiteWater Composites. This was followed by the merger with Brookside Engineering in 1985 and Barr & Wray in 1987.

In 1998, the company entered into a limited license agreement to manufacture FlowRiders.

In 2002, WhiteWater acquired Prime Play (now Prime Interactives).

In 2014, WhiteWater acquired Wave Loch's FlowRider line of products and IP.

In 2015 and 2016, Canada named WhiteWater Best Managed Company.

In 2018, WhiteWater launched Vantage, a guest engagement and operational optimization platform, which was the recipient of an IAAPA Brass Ring Award in 2018 and a WWA Leading Edge Award in 2019.

In 2019, the company announced a deal with Wiegand-Maelzer to acquire exclusive rights to the award-winning SlideWheel.

Installations
WhiteWater West has completed over 5,000 projects worldwide and has a workforce of over 600 employees. Some notable installations include:

 AquaDuck on the Disney Dream and the Disney Fantasy cruise ships
 Disney's Typhoon Lagoon's Surf Pool in Orlando, Florida, United States
 Sunway Lagoon in Selangor, Malaysia features WhiteWater products such as a Boomerango, Abyss, AquaLoop, and AquaPlay.
 Tsunami Surge at Six Flags Hurricane Harbor Chicago
 Wet'n'Wild Gold Coast in Queensland, Australia
 Wet'n'Wild Las Vegas in Las Vegas, Nevada, United States
 Ramayana Water Park in Pattaya, Thailand
 Shanghai Haichang Ocean Park in Shanghai, China, is home to the world's longest Spinning Rapids Ride.

References

1980 establishments in British Columbia
Amusement ride manufacturers
Manufacturing companies established in 1980
Manufacturing companies of Canada
Companies based in Richmond, British Columbia
Water rides manufactured by WhiteWater West